Benaam Badsha is a 1991 Indian Hindi-language crime drama film directed by K. Ravi Shankar and produced by K. Ramji. It stars Anil Kapoor, Juhi Chawla and Shilpa Shirodkar in pivotal roles. The film was a moderate critical and commercial success, and the fourteenth highest grossing Indian film of 1991.  This was a remake of the Tamil film Pudhea Paadhai.

Synopsis 
Found in a garbage bin, abandoned by his biological parents, a young man grows up to be a paid assassin, kidnapper, and rapist (Anil Kapoor). One of his rape victims is Jyoti (Juhi Chawla), who is raped on the day of her marriage to a doctor groom. Her life ruined, unwed, she decides to convince her rapist to marry her, and goes to live in his neighborhood. But her rapist will not marry her, however, she continues to pursue her goal, and after feigning a pregnancy, she does convince him to allow her to move in with him – amongst ruins, without a roof. She soon starts to transform him, with considerable success. She names him Deepak, so that he has a name others can call him by. Deepak receives a contract to kill Kaameshwari (Rohini Hattangadi) by Jaikal (Amrish Puri). Deepak refuses to take this contract, and shortly thereafter, he is arrested by the police for Kaameshwari's death. With a background such as his, will he be able to convince the authorities that he was not involved in her death, and that he was framed for it?

Cast 
 Anil Kapoor ... Deepak
 Juhi Chawla ... Jyoti
 Shilpa Shirodkar ... Bijli
 Amrish Puri ... Minister Jaikal
 Rohini Hattangadi ... Kaameshwari
 Sudhir Pandey ... Abhinandan Tiwari
 Viju Khote ...  Hotel Security Guard
 Ashok Saraf ... Vinay Chandra 'VCR' Rathod
 Yunus Parvez....Munshi of Jaikaal
 Mahavir Shah ... Inspector Satyaprakash Verma
 Satish Shah....Ganpat
 Rakesh Bedi ... Ganpat's nephew
Ravindra Kapoor..... Jyoti's Dad
Shashi Puri ... as Doctor/Jyoti's Groom
Seema Deo ... Savitri Maa

Soundtrack

References

External links 

1990s Hindi-language films
1991 films
Films scored by Laxmikant–Pyarelal
Hindi remakes of Tamil films
Indian crime drama films